Sheva may refer to:

Arts and entertainment

Characters
 Sheeva, a shokan female warrior of the Mortal Kombat franchise
 Sheva Alomar, a character in Resident Evil 5
 Sheva, the Benevolent, the title character in Richard Cumberland's play The Jew

Other arts and entertainment
 Arutz Sheva, an Israeli media network
 Sheva (band), an Israeli world music band founded in2000

 Sheva's War, a 1998 graphic novel by Christopher Moeller
 SheVa tanks, immense artillery vehicles in the Legacy of the Aldenata series of books
 SHEVA virus from the book Darwin's Radio and Darwin's Children by Greg Bear

People
 Bas Sheva (1925–1960), Jewish-American singer
 A nickname for footballer Andriy Shevchenko

Places 
 Sheva, Virginia, United States
 Tel Be'er Sheva, an archeological site in southern Israel
 Tel Sheva, a Bedouin town in the Southern District of Israel

Other uses
 Shva (◌ְ), a sign for a half-vowel or for the absence of vowel in the Hebrew alphabet
 The number 7, as pronounced in Hebrew; see Hebrew numerals

See also
Sheba (disambiguation)